This is a list of Bhojpuri language television channels in India.

Government Owned Channel
DD Bihar
DD Uttar Pradesh

General Entertainment
Pasand TV
Zee Ganga

Defunct channels
Abzy Dhakad
Dishum TV
Enterr10 Rangeela
Mahuaa TV
Surya Bhojpuri

Music
Sangeet Bhojpuri

Movies
B4U Bhojpuri
Bhojpuri Cinema
Dabangg
Filamchi Bhojpuri
Oscar Movies Bhojpuri
Rishu Movies Bhojpuri
Zee Biskope

Defunct channels
Enterr 10 Movies

OTT Platforms
Dangal Play
Eros Now
JioCinema
Lionsgate Play
MX Player
Zee5

References

Bhojpuri language

Bhojpuri language
Television in Mauritius